This is a list of notable managed DNS providers in a comparison table. A managed DNS provider offers either a web-based control panel or downloadable software that allows users to manage their DNS traffic via specified protocols such as: DNS Failover, Dynamic IP addresses, SMTP Authentication, and GeoDNS.

See also
 Public recursive name server

References

Domain Name System